is a 1969 Japanese television series. It is the 7th NHK taiga drama, the 1st to be televised in color.

Story
Ten to Chi to deals with the Sengoku period. Based on Chōgorō Kaionji's novels "Ten to Chi to". Now only episode 50 exists.

The story chronicles the life of Nagao Kagetora.

Cast

Nagao/Uesugi clan
 Kōji Ishizaka as Nagao Kagetora
 Osamu Takizawa as Nagao Tamekage
 Takashi Yamaguchi as Nagao Masakage
 Takashi Shimura as Nagao Fusakage
 Jukichi Uno as Usami Sadamitsu
 Etsushi Takahashi as Usami Sadakatsu
 Yū Fujiki as Kakizaki Yajirō
 Hideo Takamatsu as Kanazu Shinbei
 Shirō Itō as Naya Tatsuzo
 Ineko Arima as Mats as Naya Tatsuzoue
 Goichi Yamada as Tokura Yohachiro
 Akira Nagoya as Kakizaki Yosaburo
 Noboru Nakaya as Sugihara Noriie
 Shunya Shimazaki as Kitajō Takahiro
 Yoshi Katō as Shoda Hitachinosuke
 Masakane Yonekura as Katō Danzō
 Taketoshi Naito as Honjō Yoshihide
 Hiroyuki Nagato as Hattori Genki
 Ineko Arima as Matsue
 Michiyo Aratama as Kesagozen

Takeda clan
 Kōji Takahashi as Takeda Shingen
 Masaru Nakamura as Takeda Katsuyori
 Teruhiko Aoi as Takeda Yoshinobu
 Tamao Nakamuraas Suwagoryonin
 Jun Tazaki as Takeda Nobutora
 Ryūtarō Ōtomo as Itagaki Nobukata
 Kunishirō Hayashi as Morozumi Torasada
 Tappie Shimokawa as Oyamada Masatatsu
 Akira Yamauchi as Baba Nobuharu
 Kunio Murai as Kōsaka Masanobu

Others
Ryōtarō Sugi as Oda Nobunaga
 Mitsuo Hamada as Kinoshita Tokichiro
 Ryunosuke Kaneda as Shibata Katsuie
 Seiji Matsuyama as Tokugawa Ieyasu
 Yasukiyo Umeno as Miyoshi Nagayoshi
 Gaku Yamamoto as Ashikaga Yoshiteru
 Shun Ōide as Ashikaga Yoshiaki
 Kazuo Kitamura as Murakami Yoshikiyo
 Makoto Fujita as ZNaya Heihachiro
 Asao Sano as Konoe Sakihisa
 Kichiemon Nakamura as Saito Dosan
 Tatsuo Matsumura as Ota Sukemasa
 Kohji Moritsugu as Hojo Ujimasa
 Rokkō Toura as Suwa Yorishige
 Masayuki Mori as Kosai

References

External links
Taiga drama Ten to Chi to official NHK

1969 Japanese television series debuts
1969 Japanese television series endings
Taiga drama
1960s drama television series
Jidaigeki television series
Cultural depictions of Uesugi Kenshin
Cultural depictions of Takeda Shingen